Sumaira Zahoor (born August 15, 1979) is an Olympic track and field athlete from Pakistan. She became Pakistan's third female to compete at an Olympics when she took part in the women's 1500 metres at the 2004 Summer Olympics.

In 2004 Zahoor participated in the 1500 m at 2004 Athens Olympics where she placed 15th in her heat. In 2005, she participated in the 4th Women Islamic Games in Tehran where she won a silver in 1500 m and a bronze in 4×400 m relay.

In September 2010, Zahoor was found guilty of doping and banned for two years by Pakistan Sports Board.

References

1979 births
Living people
Pakistani female middle-distance runners
Pakistani female sprinters
Olympic athletes of Pakistan
Athletes (track and field) at the 2004 Summer Olympics
Athletes (track and field) at the 2002 Asian Games
Pakistani sportspeople in doping cases
Doping cases in athletics
South Asian Games silver medalists for Pakistan
South Asian Games bronze medalists for Pakistan
Asian Games competitors for Pakistan
South Asian Games medalists in athletics